"Sweet Soul Music" is a soul song, first released by Arthur Conley in 1967. Written by Conley and Otis Redding, it is based on the Sam Cooke song "Yeah Man" from his posthumous album Shake; the opening riff is a quote from Elmer Bernstein's score for the 1960 movie The Magnificent Seven.

In the US, "Sweet Soul Music" reached the No. 2 spot on the Billboard Hot 100 (behind "The Happening" by The Supremes), and No. 2 on the Billboard R&B chart. Overseas, it peaked at No. 7 on the UK Singles Chart. "Sweet Soul Music" sold over one million copies, and was awarded a gold disc.

J. W. Alexander, Cooke's business partner, sued both Redding and Conley for appropriating the melody. A settlement was reached in which Cooke's name was added to the writer credits, and Redding agreed to record some songs in the future from Kags Music, a Cooke–Alexander enterprise.

Lyrics
The song is an homage to soul music. The following songs are mentioned in the lyrics:
"Going to a Go-Go", by the Miracles; the group is not explicitly mentioned.
"Love Is a Hurtin' Thing", by Lou Rawls
"Hold On, I'm Comin'", by Sam & Dave
"Mustang Sally", by Wilson Pickett
"Fa-Fa-Fa-Fa-Fa (Sad Song)", by Otis Redding. A brief instrumental version of the chorus for the song is quoted, after Conley says, "Hit it, Otis".

Additionally, James Brown is described as "the king of them all".

At the end of the song, Arthur Conley sings, "Otis Redding got the feeling."

References

External links

Songs about soul
Songs written by Otis Redding
Songs written by Sam Cooke
1967 singles
1967 songs
Atco Records singles